Ricardo Díez-Hochleitner Rodríguez (born 30 June 1953), is a Spanish diplomat and civil servant, current Ambassador of Spain to Morocco.

Career 
Hochleitner has a degree of Law from the Autonomous University of Madrid, and is the son of the professor, diplomat and honorary president of the Club of Rome, Ricardo Díez-Hochleitner.

As Ambassador 
He entered the Diplomatic Career in 1979 and has served as director of the cabinet of the Minister of Foreign Affairs, secretary at the Spanish embassy in Germany, deputy assistant general director of Community Coordination for Commercial Customs Affairs and deputy and general director of Community Technical Coordination. In 1993 he was named ambassador of Spain to the Dominican Republic and, later, director of the International Department of the Cabinet of the Presidency of the Government and ambassador of Spain in Austria, Slovenia and Bosnia-Herzegovina. In 2000, he became General Manager of Foreign Policy for Europe.

Royal Household of Spain 
From 2002 to 2011 he was Secretary General of the House of His Majesty the King of Spain, under the presidency of the diplomat Alberto Aza. In 2011 he became the Spanish Ambassador before the Organisation for Economic Co-operation and Development (OECD). Since 2015, he occupies the Spanish embassy in the Kingdom of Morocco, after having sounded his name for the Portuguese embassy. He is member of the European Academy of Sciences and Arts.

References

1953 births
Living people
People from Bogotá
Knights Grand Cross of the Order of Isabella the Catholic
Recipients of the Order of Isabella the Catholic
Grand Crosses of the Order of the Sun of Peru
Autonomous University of Madrid alumni
Members of the European Academy of Sciences and Arts
Ambassadors of Spain to Austria
Ambassadors of Spain to Morocco
Ambassadors of Spain to the Organisation for Economic Co-operation and Development